Comallo is a village and municipality in Río Negro Province in Argentina.

Climate

References

Populated places in Río Negro Province